This is a list of members of the Privy Council of Northern Ireland.  The Privy Council was created in 1922, and ceased to meet in 1972, since when no appointments have been made although it has never been formally abolished.  Two members are still living as of August 2022.

Members

See also
List of Northern Ireland members of the Privy Council of the United Kingdom

References

History of Northern Ireland
 
Northern Ireland
Privy Council